St. Paul A.M.E. Church is a historic African Methodist Episcopal church located at Park Ave and N. 5th St. in Columbia, Missouri.  It was built in 1891, and has Gothic Revival and Romanesque Revival design elements.

It was added to the National Register of Historic Places  in 1980.

References

Bibliography

Churches on the National Register of Historic Places in Missouri
Gothic Revival church buildings in Missouri
Romanesque Revival church buildings in Missouri
Churches completed in 1891
African Methodist Episcopal churches in Missouri
Churches in Columbia, Missouri
African-American history in Columbia, Missouri
National Register of Historic Places in Columbia, Missouri
National Register of Historic Places in Boone County, Missouri